Chionodes hayreddini is a moth of the family Gelechiidae. It is found in Austria, Switzerland, Italy, Bulgaria and Romania.

References

Moths described in 1986
Chionodes
Moths of Europe